A total solar eclipse will occur on Monday, September 12, 2072. A solar eclipse occurs when the Moon passes between Earth and the Sun, thereby totally or partly obscuring the image of the Sun for a viewer on Earth. A total solar eclipse occurs when the Moon's apparent diameter is larger than the Sun's, blocking all direct sunlight, turning day into darkness. Totality occurs in a narrow path across Earth's surface, with the partial solar eclipse visible over a surrounding region thousands of kilometres wide.

This is the first of 55 central eclipses of Solar Saros 155. The first will be in 2072 and the last will be in 3046. This is the first of 56 umbral eclipses of Solar Saros 155. The first will be in 2072 and the last will be in 3064.

The total phase of eclipse will be only in Siberia in Russia. Large cities, in which the total phase will be seen, include Yakutsk, Neryungri, Mirny in Sakha Republic and Khatanga in Krasnoyarsk Krai (also Norilsk will have 98% sun obscuration). As a partial, the eclipse will seen mostly in Europe (except for south of Europe), mostly in Asia and on the east of Greenland.

Related eclipses

Solar eclipses 2069–2072

Saros 155 series

Metonic series

Notes

References

2072 09 12
2072 in science
2072 09 12
2072 09 12